Andreas Oschkenat (born 9 June 1962) is a retired East German hurdler, who won the bronze medal in 60 m hurdles at the 1983 European Indoor Championships in Athletics in Budapest. He started for the Sportvereinigung (SV) Dynamo.

His personal best time was 13.50 seconds, achieved in June 1983 in Karl-Marx-Stadt.

References 

1962 births
Living people
East German male hurdlers
People from Sonneberg
Sportspeople from Thuringia